is a Japanese Professional baseball pitcher for the Fukuoka SoftBank Hawks of Nippon Professional Baseball.

Early baseball career
Kasaya participated in the 2rd grade summer 95th Japanese High School Baseball Championship as an ace pitcher at the Ōita Prefectural Ōita Commercial High School with Hikaru Kawase and Masato Morishita.

Professional career
On October 23, 2014, Kasaya was drafted by the Fukuoka Softbank Hawks in the 2014 Nippon Professional Baseball draft.

In 2015 season, he played in the Western League of NPB's minor leagues and played in informal matches against Shikoku Island League Plus's teams.

He spent the 2016 season on left elbow rehabilitation.

On August 23, 2017, he debuted in the Pacific League against the Saitama Seibu Lions.  he was selected as the Japan Series roster in the 2017 Japan Series.

From 2017 season to 2019 season, he recorded with a 14 Games pitched, a 0–1 Win–loss record, a 5.63 ERA, a one Holds, a 16 strikeouts in 16 innings.

On July 17, 2020, Kasaya pitched in relief against the Orix Buffaloes and became his first Winning pitcher. And he became the winning pitcher on August 27 as the starting pitcher. In 2020 season, Kasaya recorded with a 20 Games pitched, a 4–4 Win–loss record, a 2.84 ERA, a 67 strikeouts in 57 innings. In the 2020 Japan Series against the Yomiuri Giants, he was selected as the Japan Series roster.

In 2021 season, Kasaya pitched a good game against the Orix Buffaloes on March 30 as a starting pitcher, allowing one run in six innings, but after that his pitching continued to suffer and he was reassigned to relief pitching in May 4. However, because he pitched well as a relief pitcher, he was used as a starting pitcher at the end of the season and finished the season with 16Games pitched, a 3-4 record, a 4.27 earned run average, and 67 strikeouts in 59 innings pitched.

In 2022 season, he finished the regular season with a 16 Games pitched, a 0–0 Win–loss record, a 6.35 ERA, and a 14 strikeouts in 17 innings.

References

External links

 Career statistics - NPB.jp
 67 Shunsuke Kasaya PLAYERS2022 - Fukuoka SoftBank Hawks Official site

1997 births
Living people
Fukuoka SoftBank Hawks players
Japanese baseball players
Nippon Professional Baseball pitchers
Baseball people from Ōita Prefecture
Japanese expatriate baseball players in Puerto Rico
Gigantes de Carolina players